The Centre for Evidence-Based Medicine (CEBM), based in the Nuffield Department of Primary Care Health Sciences at the University of Oxford, is an academic-led centre dedicated to the practice, teaching, and dissemination of high quality evidence-based medicine to improve healthcare in everyday clinical practice. CEBM was founded by David Sackett in 1995. It was subsequently directed by Brian Haynes and Paul Glasziou. Since 2010 it has been led by Professor Carl Heneghan, a clinical epidemiologist and general practitioner.

There are currently over 25 active staff and honorary members of the CEBM. The staff include clinicians, statisticians, epidemiologists, information specialists, quantitative and qualitative researchers.

Teaching and degrees 
CEBM is the academic lead for Oxford University's Graduate School in Evidence-Based Healthcare, together with the university's Department of Continuing Education. The Graduate School includes a MSc in Evidence-Based Health Care and a DPhil in Evidence-Based Health Care, along with a range of short courses, including a course on the History and Philosophy of Evidence-Based Healthcare which was developed by Jeremy Howick and Iain Chalmers.

EBM Live conference 
Every year, CEBM organises EBM Live, (previously Evidence Live) a multi-day conference focussing on developments in the area of evidence-based medicine. The conference is organised in collaboration with the British Medical Journal. Themes for the conference include Improving the Quality of Research; disentangling the Problems of Too Much and Too Little Medicine; transforming the Communication of Evidence for Better Health; training the Next Generation of Leaders and translating Evidence into Better-Quality Health Services.

Notable projects

Levels of evidence 
CEBM has developed a widely adopted systematic hierarchy of the quality of medical research evidence, named the levels of evidence. Systematic reviews of randomised clinical trials (encompassing homogeneity) are seen as the highest possible level of evidence, as full assessment and aggregated synthesis of underlying evidence is possible.

Tamiflu 
In collaboration with the British Medical Journal, Carl Heneghan and team found no evidence that Tamiflu helped to reduce complications of influenza. This has become a controversial topic, as the United Kingdom government spend £473 million on the purchase of Tamiflu, despite the systematic review claiming to find no evidence for the effectiveness of it.

Sports products 
A systematic review conducted in 2012 discovered a very little effect of carbohydrate drinks on sport performance of the general population. This work formed part of a joint investigation with BBC Panorama and the British Medical Journal. A linked article published in the BMJ reported a "striking lack of evidence" to back up claims for popular sports brands. A further analysis of a broad range of sports products showed that the evidence for many sports products is poor quality and insufficient to inform the public about the benefits and harms of the products.

Self care 
Systematic review and individual patient data meta analysis research in the centre has shown that, even with little training, people on oral anticoagulation (Warfarin) can successfully self-monitor, and even self-manage their disease in the community. Patients capable of self-monitoring and self-adjusting therapy have fewer thromboembolic events and lower mortality than those who self-monitor alone. In 2014, Carl Heneghan along with Alison Ward became directors of a World Health Organization Collaborating Centre for Self-Care in Non-communicable disease.

AllTrials 
The centre is one of the co-founders of the AllTrials campaign, which has been influential in ensuring that the results of all clinical trials are registered and reported in full.

Diagnostic technologies and reasoning 

The centre has a strong diagnostic theme which includes assessing novel diagnostic technologies relevant to improving the diagnosis of disease in primary care and also to improving diagnostic reasoning. In 2015, the centre produced a report for the Department of Health on antimicrobial resistance diagnostics, which highlighted the considerable number of new diagnostic technologies in development to underpin rational prescribing of antibiotics.

COMPare project 

In 2015 the COMPare project was launched, addressing outcome switching in clinical trials. The project systematically checks every trial published in the top five medical journals, to see if they have misreported their findings, comparing each clinical trial report against its registry entry. The project has found that some trials report their outcomes perfectly, but for many others outcomes specified in the registry entry were never reported. The updates to the trials are updated live on the COMPare website.  The project highlights how researchers are duped by the common practice in clinical trial reporting of "outcome switching".

Adverse events 

In March 2016, research at the centre systematically identified 353 medicinal products withdrawn worldwide because of adverse drug reactions, assessed the level of evidence used for making the withdrawal decisions, and found that only 40 drugs were withdrawn worldwide. Withdrawal was significantly less likely in Africa than in other continents. Furthermore, in 47% of the 95 drugs for which death was documented as a reason for withdrawal, more than two years elapsed between the first report of a death and withdrawal of the drug.

Notable associates 
Notable associates of the centre include:

 Ben Goldacre, Senior clinical Research fellow
 Iain Chalmers
 Muir Gray
 Professor Rod Jackson, University of Auckland

References 

1995 establishments in England
Educational institutions established in 1995
Research institutes of the University of Oxford
Evidence-Based Medicine
Medical and health organisations based in England
English medical research
Evidence-based medicine